Uncinia subsacculata is a species of plant in the sedge family, Cyperaceae. It is endemic to Ecuador. Its natural habitat is subtropical or tropical moist montane forests.

References

subsacculata
Flora of Ecuador
Vulnerable plants
Plants described in 1995
Taxonomy articles created by Polbot